"Più bella cosa" (meaning "The Most Beautiful Thing") is an Italian language song written by singer Eros Ramazzotti, with Claudio Guidetti, Maurizio Fabrizio and Adelio Cogliati, and performed by Ramazzotti in February 1996, as a first single and pre-release from his album Dove c'è musica ("Where There's Music") that came out on May 13 of that year.

The song is dedicated to the Swiss model Michelle Hunziker, Ramazotti's girlfriend at the time. The two had a daughter born just a few months later on December 5, 1996, whom they named Aurora Sophie. Ramazotti would go on releasing his song L'aurora, dedicated to his newborn, in February 1997. He later married Hunziker in 1998, but the two divorced in 2002.

Accolades
He performed the song publicly during Festivalbar in summer of 1996. The song won the "Best Song" award, with the album being awarded "Best Album" award. The song also won the MTV Europe Gold Awards in 1997.

Music video
The music video was directed by Nigel Dick for Squeak Pictures, featuring Ramazzotti and Hunziker.

"La cosa más bella"
As is traditional with many other successful releases of Ramazzotti's, he released a Spanish language parallel song for Spain, Latin America and United States Latin markets titled "La cosa más bella". That version appears in the parallel Spanish-language version to the album Dove c'è musica retitled Donde hay música. It peaked at number two on the Hot Latin Songs chart and number one on the Latin Pop Songs chart in the United States.

Charts

Certifications

References

1996 songs
Eros Ramazzotti songs
Italian-language songs
Songs written by Eros Ramazzotti
Songs written by Claudio Guidetti
Songs written by Maurizio Fabrizio
Music videos directed by Nigel Dick